Streptomyces rubiginosus is a bacterium species from the genus of Streptomyces which has been isolated from soil. Streptomyces rubiginosus produces glucose isomerase. glucose isomerase from Streptomyces rubiginosus can be used to texture fish and meat products.

Further reading

See also 
 List of Streptomyces species

References

External links
Type strain of Streptomyces rubiginosus at BacDive -  the Bacterial Diversity Metadatabase

rubiginosus
Bacteria described in 1958